The legislative veto was a feature of dozens of statutes enacted by the United States federal government between approximately 1930 and 1980, until held unconstitutional by the U.S. Supreme Court in 1983. It is a provision whereby Congress passes a statute granting authority to the President and reserving for itself the ability to override, through simple majority vote, individual actions taken by the President pursuant to that authority.

It has also been widely used by state governments.

Federal government
The legislative veto was first developed in context of the delegation to the president to reorganize governmental agencies and was first authorized by the Legislative Appropriations Act in 1932. It was furthered by the necessities of providing for national security and foreign affairs immediately prior to and during World War II. While the scope of the nondelegation doctrine was greatly limited, Congress wished to provide a method of retaining power over delegated authority, and used the legislative veto as a method of allowing the Executive Branch to respond flexibly to events under "intelligible principles" while allowing Congress to overturn Presidential actions that would have lacked sufficient support for legislation explicitly authorizing them.

The legislative veto provision found in federal legislation took several forms. Some laws established a veto procedure that required a simple resolution passed by a majority vote of one chamber of Congress. Other laws required a concurrent resolution passed by both the House and the Senate. Some statutes made the veto process more difficult by requiring not just a majority vote of one or both houses, but a majority of the membership of the legislative body, present or not. Some designated neither the House nor the Senate, but authorized one or more Congressional committees to exercise the veto on behalf of Congress.

The proliferation of legislative veto provisions in legislation raised a series of constitutional questions. Congress until relatively recently had applied the veto provisions to some action taken by the President or another executive officer—such as a reorganization of an agency, the lowering or raising of tariff rates, the disposal of federal property—then began expanding the device to give itself a veto over regulations issued by executive branch agencies, and proposals were made to give Congress a veto over all regulations issued by executive branch independent agencies.

INS v. Chadha

Under the Immigration and Nationality Act of 1965, the Attorney General could suspend a deportation proceeding if the deportation would result in "extreme hardship". After making such a finding, the Attorney General would send a report to Congress, and either the House or Senate could veto the Attorney General's decision by majority vote. In Immigration and Naturalization Service v. Chadha, 462 U.S. 919 (1983), the Supreme Court considered such a case, in which the Attorney General had found that deporting an essentially stateless person would result in extreme hardship, and the House had vetoed the Attorney General's decision. 

The Court held that a legislative veto on the part of one chamber of the legislature was unconstitutional as violating both the principle of bicameralism embodied in Article I, Section 1 and Section 7, and the presentment provisions of Clauses 2 and 3 of Section 7. The Court's analysis of the presentment issue stated that a provision for a two-chamber veto, though complying with bicameralism, and a provision for veto by a Congressional committee suffer the same constitutional infirmity. In the words of dissenting Justice White, the Court in Chadha "sound[ed] the death knell for nearly 200 other statutory provisions in which Congress has reserved a 'legislative veto.'"

Constitutional Convention
Delegates to the Constitutional Convention of 1787 that drafted the U.S. Constitution considered and rejected proposals for a legislative veto designed to reconcile the states to the federal union. Edmund Randolph proposed that: "The National Legislature ought to be impowered [sic] . . . to negative all laws passed by the several States contravening in the opinion of the National Legislature the articles of Union." The provision became part of Alexander Hamilton's proposal for a new government based on national consolidation, all but eliminating state sovereignty.

States
As of 1975, 10 states' constitutions allowed the governor to reorganize state government departments subject to a legislative veto: Alaska, California, Illinois, Kansas, Maryland, Massachusetts, Michigan, Missouri, New Jersey, and Vermont. Three states had statutes authorizing this procedure: Kentucky, Pennsylvania, and South Carolina.  In the case of Pennsylvania, however, the State Supreme Court has invalidated the legislative veto.

See also
 Veto
 United States Constitution

References
Notes

Bibliography
Barbara Hinkson Craig, Chadha: The Story of an Epic Constitutional Struggle (NY: Oxford University Press, 1988)
Michael J. Berry, The Modern Legislative Veto: Macropolitical Conflict and the Legacy of Chadha (University of Michigan Press, 2016)

External links
 Constitution with Annotations - Article II. Legislative Department

Federal government of the United States
United States administrative law
American legal terminology
Veto